The 2014–15 Richmond Spiders women's basketball team will represent the University of Richmond during the 2014–15 college basketball season. Michael Shafer assumes the responsibility as head coach for his tenth season. The Spiders were members of the Atlantic 10 Conference and play their home games at the Robins Center. They finished the season 19–14, 9–7 in A-10 play to finish in fifth place. They advanced to the quarterfinals of the Atlantic 10 women's tournament where they lost to Fordham. They were invited to the Women's National Invitation Tournament where defeated Stetson in the first round before losing to a A-10 member Duquesne in the second round.

2014–15 media
All Spiders games are broadcast on WTVR 6.3 with Robert Fish on the call. The games are also streamed on Spider TV .

Roster

Schedule

|-
!colspan=9 style="background:#990000; color:#000066;"| Regular Season

|-
!colspan=9 style="background:#000066; color:#990000;"| Atlantic 10 Tournament

|-
!colspan=9 style="background:#000066; color:#990000;"| WNIT

Rankings
2014–15 NCAA Division I women's basketball rankings

See also
 2014–15 Richmond Spiders men's basketball team
 Richmond Spiders women's basketball

References

Richmond Spiders women's basketball seasons
Richmond
2015 Women's National Invitation Tournament participants
Richmond Spiders women's basketball
Richmond